Demmin is a former Kreis (district) in Mecklenburg-Western Pomerania, Germany. It was bounded by (from the south and clockwise) the districts of Müritz, Güstrow, Nordvorpommern, Ostvorpommern and Mecklenburg-Strelitz.

History
Demmin District was established in 1994 by merging the former districts of Demmin, Altentreptow and Malchin. On 4 September 2011, the bulk of the district was merged to Mecklenburgische Seenplatte, while the northeastern Ämter Peenetal/Loitz and Jarmen-Tutow became part of Vorpommern-Greifswald.

Coat of arms

Towns and municipalities
The subdivisions of the district were (situation August 2011):

References

External links

Official website (German)

Former districts of Mecklenburg-Western Pomerania
Districts of Prussia
2011 disestablishments in Germany
States and territories disestablished in 2011